Sebastian José Colón (born 25 June 1998) is a Colombian footballer who currently plays as a midfielder for Marathón.

Career statistics

Club

Notes

References

1998 births
Living people
Colombian footballers
Colombian expatriate footballers
Association football midfielders
C.D. Real de Minas players
C.D. Marathón players
Liga Nacional de Fútbol Profesional de Honduras players
Colombian expatriate sportspeople in Honduras
Expatriate footballers in Honduras